The Cat Island, part of the Babel Group within the Furneaux Group, is a  unpopulated granite island, located in Bass Strait, lying off the east coast of Flinders Island, Tasmania, south of Victoria, in south-eastern Australia.

Cat Island is part of the Babel Island Group Important Bird Area.

Fauna

Seabirds and waders recorded as breeding on the island include little penguin, short-tailed shearwater, silver gull, Pacific gull, crested tern, sooty oystercatcher, pied oystercatcher and Australasian gannet.  Resident reptiles include White's skink and tiger snake.  The rakali has also been recorded on the island.

The historically important breeding colony of Australasian gannets, with an estimated 5,000-10,000 birds at the beginning of the 20th century, declined to extinction by the mid-1980s as a result of, at first, human intrusion, followed by fires, disturbance and, finally, predation by white-bellied sea-eagles.

See also

 List of islands of Tasmania

References

Furneaux Group
Protected areas of Tasmania
Important Bird Areas of Tasmania
Islands of North East Tasmania
Islands of Bass Strait